Davenport railway station may refer to:
 Davenport railway station (England), in Stockport, Greater Manchester, United Kingdom
 Davenport station (Ontario), a former station in Toronto, Canada